The Imperial German Navy  Zeppelin LZ 31 (L 6) was a M-class World War I zeppelin.

Operational history

Throughout the career of the Imperial German Navy Airship LZ 31 took part in 36 reconnaissance missions around the North Sea. This included marking minefields and one raid on the United Kingdom, dropping  of bombs.

Raid on Cuxhaven 

The Raid on Cuxhaven was a British ship-based air-raid on the Imperial German Navy complex at Cuxhaven mounted on Christmas Day, 1914. After the raid Zeppelin LZ 31 set off to find the attacking naval force the aircraft came from. After retrieving the aircraft, the Navy force attempted to return to base but  was left behind. High enough that the Royal Navy ship's guns couldn't harm it LZ 31 dropped bombs on  but none of the Airship's bombs hit their mark.

Fire and destruction
On 16 September 1916 the Airship was in its hangar at Fuhlsbüttel undergoing inflation when it caught fire and was destroyed with Zeppelin LZ 36.

Specifications (LZ 31 / M2-class zeppelin)

See also

List of Zeppelins

Notes

References

 

Airships of Germany
Hydrogen airships
Zeppelins
Aviation accidents and incidents in 1916
Accidents and incidents involving balloons and airships